YHS may refer to:

Schools
 Yangjae High School, Seocho-dong, Seocho District, Seoul, Korea
 Yap High School in Yap, Federated States of Micronesia
 Yokota High School, Yokota Air Base, Japan
 Yorktown High School (disambiguation)
 Yorkville High School, Yorkville, Illinois
 Yosemite High School, Oakhurst, California
 Youngker High School, Buckeye, Arizona
 Youngsville High School, a public secondary school in Youngsville, Pennsylvania
 Ypsilanti High School, Ypsilanti Township, Michigan

Other
 A variant form of IHS symbolising the name of Jesus
 Yeo Hiap Seng, a drink manufacturer
 Sechelt Aerodrome, IATA code

See also
 YHSS (disambiguation)